The Hong Kong national ice hockey team is the national men's ice hockey team of Hong Kong and a member of the International Ice Hockey Federation (IIHF). Hong Kong is currently ranked 44th in the IIHF World Rankings and competes in Division III of the IIHF World Championships.

History

The Hong Kong Ice Hockey Association (HKIHA) was founded on 8 August 1980. Hong Kong joined the IIHF on 31 March 1983, and made its debut in the world championship at Pool D in Perth, Australia in 1987. Hong Kong tied Chinese Taipei, 2–2 in its first international game on 13 March 1987 and went on to win the Fair Play Cup at the world tournament. After their one appearance in the World Championship, Hong Kong took a hiatus from participation in international tournaments.

Although there was plenty of ice hockey activity in Hong Kong, local teams (usually stocked with Canadian and American players) did not compete for the national championship until 1995–96. The first title was won by a team sponsored by Planet Hollywood.

In 2014, Hong Kong returned to the World Championships, and participated in the Division III level, the sixth and lowest tier. Since then they have participated every year at the Division III level, with their highest finish being fourth in the tournament twice (44th overall).

Tournament record

World Championships

Asian Winter Games

Challenge Cup of Asia

All-time record against other nations
As of 2019

All-time record against other teams
Updated 31 October 2015

References

External links

IIHF profile
National Teams of Ice Hockey

Ice hockey in Hong Kong
National ice hockey teams in Asia
Ice hockey